GNS Science, officially registered as the Institute of Geological and Nuclear Sciences Limited, is a New Zealand Crown Research Institute. It focuses on geology, geophysics (including seismology and volcanology), and nuclear science (particularly ion-beam technologies, isotope science and carbon dating).

GNS Science was known as the Institute of Geological and Nuclear Sciences (IGNS) from 1992 to 2005. Originally part of the New Zealand Government's Department of Scientific and Industrial Research (DSIR), it was established as an independent organisation when the Crown Research Institutes were set up in 1992.

As well as undertaking basic research, and operating the national geological hazards monitoring network (GeoNet) and the National Isotope Centre (NIC),
GNS Science contracts its services to various private groups (notably energy companies) both in New Zealand and overseas, as well as to central and local government agencies, to provide scientific advice and information.

GNS Science has its head office in Avalon, Lower Hutt, with other facilities in Gracefield, Dunedin and Wairakei.

References

External links
 GNS Science
 GeoNet Hazards Monitoring Network

Crown Research Institutes of New Zealand
Science and technology in New Zealand
National geological agencies
Nuclear technology in New Zealand
Earth sciences
Earth science research institutes